Robert Sutton may refer to:

Politicians
Robert Sutton (died 1414), MP for Lincoln
Robert Sutton (MP for Derby), see Derby
Robert Dudley alias Sutton (died 1539), MP
Robert Sutton, 1st Baron Lexinton (1594–1668), Member of Parliament for Nottinghamshire in 1625 and again in 1640
Robert Sutton, 2nd Baron Lexinton (1662–1723), English diplomat
Robert Sutton (diplomat) (1671–1746), diplomat and politician, great-nephew of the 1st Baron Lexinton

Sports
 Robert Sutton (sailor) (1911–1977), American sailor who competed in the 1932 Summer Olympics
 Bob Sutton (American football) (born 1951), American football coach
 Robert Sutton (cricketer, born 1940), New Zealand cricketer
 Robert Sutton (cricketer, born 1813) (1813–1885), English cricketer

Religion
Robert Sutton (Archdeacon of Lewes) (1832–1910), Anglican priest
Robert Sutton (martyr) (died 1587), English Roman Catholic priest
Robert Sutton (d. 1588), martyr
Robert Sutton (priest), Irish priest

Others
Robert Sutton (Irish judge) (died 1430), Irish judge and Crown official
Robert I. Sutton (born 1954), professor of management science and engineering in the Stanford Engineering School